Revin John is a radio personality who has been heard on KBIG-FM in Los Angeles.  He was also Virgin Radio Dubai's breakfast jock but was fired after he angered listeners by impersonating God in a comedy skit about a phone call with the Almighty.

As of 31 August 2009, Revin John replaced Alex Jay (who moved to the mid morning show) on the afternoon show on the Johannesburg-based radio station 94.7 Highveld Stereo. John also hosted the popular television show "Greed".

He now is the mid day DJon Portland, Oregon's KBFF 95.5 FM.

References

American radio personalities
Living people
Year of birth missing (living people)